Chaetopsis magna is a species of ulidiid or picture-winged fly in the genus Chaetopsis of the family Ulidiidae.

References

magna
Insects described in 1924